Riku Matsuda may refer to:

Riku Matsuda (footballer, born 1991), Japanese footballer
Riku Matsuda (footballer, born 1999), Japanese footballer